An A-Z list of films produced in Kuwait:

A
Anges, Les (1984)
Abo oyoun (2018)

B
Bas ya Bahar (1971)

D
Dreams Without Sleep (2002)

F
Falafel Cart (2019)

J
Just Like You Imagined (2003)

L
Losing Ahmad (2006)

M
Message, The (1976)

S
Second Blood (2016)
Second Blood 2: Back in the Army (2018)
Storm from the South (2006)

W
The Wedding of Zein (1976)
 Whispers of Sin (2010)

Y 
Yeux du golfe, Les (1984)

External links
 Kuwaiti film at the Internet Movie Database

Kuwait
Films